Robert (Bob) Smith (born December 1, 1946) is a Canadian retired professional ice hockey player. Smith was selected 11th overall in the 1967 NHL Amateur Draft by the Pittsburgh Penguins, but did not make it to the NHL, playing five seasons in the minor leagues.

Smith was born in Sault Ste. Marie, Ontario. Smith was an 18-year-old playing in the Northern Ontario Junior Hockey League with the Sault Ste. Marie Greyhounds when he was selected by the Pittsburgh Penguins with the 11th overall pick of the 1967 NHL Amateur draft. Although all 12 NHL teams were eligible, both the St. Louis Blues and Toronto Maple Leafs passed on their opportunity to select a player in the first round, allowing Pittsburgh to use their second pick to take Smith.

With the exception of playing three games in the CHL with the Amarillo Wranglers, Smith played his entire professional career (1967–72) in the IHL with the Muskegon Mohawks.

Championships
Smith won the IHL Championship (Turner Cup) as a member of the 1967-68 Muskegon Mohawks. Smith was the team's top goal scorer in the playoffs with six goals in nine games.

Career statistics

References

External links

1946 births
Canadian ice hockey centres
Sportspeople from Sault Ste. Marie, Ontario
Living people
Sault Ste. Marie Greyhounds players
Muskegon Mohawks players
Amarillo Wranglers players
Pittsburgh Penguins draft picks
Ice hockey people from Ontario